The Polevskoy Copper Smelting Plant, also known as Polevaya or Poleva, was one of the major metallurgical facilities located in Polevskoy, in Sverdlovsk Oblast of Russia.

History
It was established by the decree of Peter the Great to process the local copper deposits. The Polevskoy Plant was named after the local river Polevaya. The plant became the basis for the settlement which later grew into the town of Polevskoy.

The place for a new plant was chosen by Vasily Tatishchev. Georg Wilhelm de Gennin was in charge of the construction. The Plant became active in 1724. The copper was branded with the symbol of the Roman goddess Venus. The Venus symbol (♀), which represents copper as a chemical element, is now displayed in the Polevskoy town coat of arms.

In 1757 the Polevskoy Plant was purchased by the Ural merchant Alexei Turchaninov along with the Seversky Pipe Plant. Along with the Seversky and Sysertsky Plants, the Polevskoy Plant represented the Sysert Mining District. It was extremely profitable. Turchaninov's descendants managed the plant til 1912. For a long time the main ore supplier for the plant was the Gumyoshevsky mine, called "The Copper Mountain" by the local populace. However in the 19th century the Gumyoshevsky mine was exhausted. After it was shut down in 1870, the Polevskoy Copper Smelting Plant was reorganized to the iron plant. In this capacity the plant stayed active until 1923, but then shut down due to the lack of prospects.

References 

Buildings and structures in Sverdlovsk Oblast
Economy of the Russian Empire
Manufacturing plants in Russia
1724 establishments in the Russian Empire
Industrial buildings completed in the 18th century
Metallurgical facilities
Companies established in 1724
Manufacturing companies disestablished in 1923
1923 disestablishments in Russia